Mónica Dossetti Merlo (born October 3 in Tlaxcala, Tlaxcala) is a Mexican actress. She made her debut as an actress as the rich and socialite Karla Greta Reyes Retana y de las Altas Torres in Volver a Empezar, role which she had reprised in El Premio Mayor and Salud, Dinero y Amor.

Telenovelas

External links
 

Living people
Mexican telenovela actresses
Mexican people of Italian descent
People from Tlaxcala City
Actresses from Tlaxcala
20th-century Mexican actresses
21st-century Mexican actresses
1966 births